The 1949 Washington and Lee Generals football team was an American football team that represented Washington and Lee University during the 1949 college football season as a member of the Southern Conference. In their first year under head coach George T. Barclay, the team compiled an overall record of 3–5–1, with a mark of 3–1–1 in conference play.

Schedule

References

Washington and Lee
Washington and Lee Generals football seasons
Washington and Lee Generals football